Jacksonia may refer to:
 Jacksonia (plant), a genus of plants in the family Fabaceae
 Jacksonia (bug), a genus of true bugs in the family Aphididae
 Jacksonia, a genus of butterflies in the family Lymantriidae, unknown status, described in 1997 by Heath